The 1972 African Cup of Nations was the eighth edition of the Africa Cup of Nations, the association football championship of Africa (CAF). It was hosted by Cameroon, in the cities of Yaoundé and Douala. Just like in 1970, the field of eight teams was split into two groups of four. The People's Republic of the Congo won its first championship, beating Mali in the final 3−2.

Qualified teams 

The 8 qualified teams are:

  (host)
 
 
 
 
 
  (holders)
 

For the first time, Ethiopia did not compete.

Squads

Venues 
The competition was played in two venues in Yaoundé and Douala.

Group stage

Group A

Group B

Knockout stage

Semifinals

Third place match

Final

Goalscorers 
5 goals
  Fantamady Keita

4 goals

  Jean-Michel M'Bono

3 goals

  Ahmed Faras
  Edmond Apéti Kaolo
  Mayanga Maku
  Jean Kalala N'Tumba

2 goals

  Jean-Baptiste N'Doga
  Paul-Gaston N'Dongo
  François M'Pelé
  Bako Touré
  Kakoko Etepé

1 goal

  Jean Paul Akono
  Simo Emmanuel Mvé
  François N'Doumbe
  Joseph Yegba Maya
  Philippe Michel Mouthé
  Norbert Owona
  Jonas Bahamboula
  Noël Birindi Minga
  Paul Moukila
  Daniel Arudhi Nicodémus
  Jonathan Niva
  Peter "Pelé" Ouma
  Adama Traoré
  Bakary Traoré
  Moussa Diakhité
  Moussa Traoré
  Bushara Abdel-Nadief
  Kamal Abdel Wahab
  Hasabu El-Sagheer
  Ahmed Bushara Wahba
  Covi Adé
  Gary Ngassebe

CAF Team of the tournament 
Goalkeeper
  Allal Ben Kassou

Defenders
  Abdella "Kaunda" El-Ser
  Tshimen Bwanga
  Paul Nlend
  Boujemaa Benkhrif

Midfielders
  Noël Birindi Minga
  Mayanga Maku
  Paul-Gaston N'Dongo
  Jean-Pierre Tokoto
Forwards
  Kakoko Etepé
  François M'Pelé

External links 
 Details at RSSSF
 Details at www.angelfire.com
 footballmundial.tripod.com
 www.world-results.net

 
Nations
African Cup Of Nations, 1972
Africa Cup of Nations tournaments
Sport in Yaoundé
Sport in Douala
African Cup Of Nations, 1972
African Cup Of Nations
African Cup Of Nations
African Cup Of Nations
Events in Yaoundé